The Orquesta Nacional de España (Spanish National Orchestra) is a Spanish orchestra based in Madrid.

History
Although the orchestra originated as of 1937, during the Spanish Civil War, it was legally founded in 1940, by the merging of Pérez Casas' Filarmónica and the Orquesta Sinfónica of Enrique Fernández Arbós.

The first official concert of the newly founded orchestra was in March 1941 at the Teatro María Guerrero in Madrid, conducted by the Portuguese conductor Pedro de Freitas Branco (1896–1963). The principal conductors of the first years of the orchestra were Ernesto Halffter, José María Franco, Enrique Jordá, Eduard Toldrà and Jesús Arámbarri, until the designation of the first principal conductor of the orchestra, Bartolomé Pérez Casas. After the death of Pérez Casas, the new principal conductor was Ataúlfo Argenta, who was in the orchestra from 1945 as the keyboard instruments player.

In 2014, David Afkham became principal conductor of the orchestra.  In February 2019, the orchestra announced the elevation of Afkham's title to chief conductor and artistic director, effective with the 2019-2020 season.  In January 2023, the orchestra announced an extension of Afkham's contract through September 2026.

Principal conductors
 Bartolomé Pérez Casas (1942–1947)
 Ataúlfo Argenta (1947–1958)
 Rafael Frühbeck de Burgos (1962–1978)
 Antoni Ros-Marbà (1978–1981)
 Jesús López-Cobos (1984–1989)
 Aldo Ceccato (1991–1994)
 Josep Pons (2003–2011)
 David Afkham (2014–2019, principal conductor; 2019–present, chief conductor and artistic advisor)

See also 
 Madrid Symphony Orchestra
 Community of Madrid Orchestra
 National Auditorium of Music
 RTVE Symphony Orchestra
 Queen Sofía Chamber Orchestra
 Teatro Real
 Teatro Monumental
 Zarzuela

References

External links
 Official homepage of the Orquesta y Coro Nacionales de España
 Luis Mario Fraile, 'Orquestas en España: Predominio de las sinfónicas'.  La factoria del ritmo website, 1 November 1995

Musical groups established in 1940
Spanish orchestras
Culture in Madrid
National orchestras
1940 establishments in Spain
Arts organizations established in 1940